Granichnoye is a rural locality (a selo) in Altaysky Selsoviet, Tabunsky District, Altai Krai, Russia. The population was 32 as of 2013. There are 3 streets.

Geography 
Granichnoye is located on the Kulundinskaya plain, 34 km west of Tabuny (the district's administrative centre) by road. Kamyshenka and Raygorod are the nearest rural localities.

References 

Rural localities in Tabunsky District